Jan Karol Tarło (c. 1593–1645) was a Polish–Lithuanian noble (szlachcic).

Son of starost Stanisław Tarło and Barbara Dulska. Married to Marianna Ligęza c. 1636.

He was castellan of Wiślice and starost of Olsztyn and Zwoleń.
His daughter Barbara married the powerful magnate Hetman Jerzy Sebastian Lubomirski.

References

Bibliography

1590s births
1645 deaths
Jan Karol